Jodie is a unisex given name. It is related to names Cody, Jodi, Jody, Codey, and Jodey. It is also a rare surname. It can be used as a nickname for Joseph, Jude, Judith, Joan and Jonathan, and a variant for Jo.

People

Female

Given name
 Jodie Allen, senior editor at the Pew Research Center
 Jodie Aysha (born 1988), English singer and songwriter
 Jodie Bowering (born 1982), Australian softball player
 Jodie Campbell (born 1972), Australian politician
 Jodie Comer (born 1993), English actress
 Jodie Connor (born 1981), English musician
 Jodie Cooper (born 1964), retired surfer
 Jodie Davis (born 1966), Australian cricketer
 Jodie deSolla (born 1982), Canadian curler
 Jodie Dibble (born 1994), English cricketer
 Jodie Dorday (born 1968), New Zealand actress
 Jodie Dry (born 1974), Australian actress
 Jodie Evans (born 1954), American political activist
 Jodie Fields (born 1984), Australian cricket player
 Jodie Fisher (born 1960), American actress
 Jodie Foster (born 1962), American actress and director
 Jodie Henry (born 1983), Australian swimmer
 Jodie Kidd (born 1978), English fashion model and media personality
 Jodie Anne Laubenberg (born 1957), American politician
 Jodie Marsh (born 1978), English model, media personality, and bodybuilder
 Jodie McMullen (born 1974), former Miss Australia Universe
 Jodie Resther (born 1977), Canadian actress
 Jodie Rogers (born 1970), Australian diver
 Jodie Scholz (born 1960), American scriptwriter and editor
 Jodie Swallow (born 1981), English triathlete
 Jodie Sweetin (born 1982), American actress and television personality, who is best known for playing a character in Full House
 Jodie Whittaker (born 1982), English actress
 Jodie Yemm (born 1967), Australian actress

Other
 Jodie (conjoined twin), pseudonym of Gracie Attard (born 2000), subject of a legal case
 Jodie Foster, American actress and filmmaker Alicia Foster (born 1962)
 Jodie Sands, American singer Eleanor DiSipio (1919–1996)

Male

Given name
 Jodie Broughton (born 1988), English rugby player
 Jodie Christian (1932–2012), American pianist
 Jodie Ferneyhough, President of the Canadian Music Publishers Association
 Jodie Meeks (born 1987), American basketball player

Nickname
 Jodie Beeler (1921–2002), American baseball player
 Jodie Mudd (born 1960), American golfer
 Jodie Whire (1910–1983), American football player

Fictional characters 
 Jodie (Case Closed), in the Japanese anime Case Closed
 Jodie Landon, in the MTV animated series Daria
 Jodie Morton, in the British soap opera Coronation Street
 Jodie Nash, in the soap opera Hollyoaks
 Jodie Holmes, in the video game Beyond: Two Souls
 Jodie Dallas, a supporting character in the 1970s television sitcom Soap, played by Billy Crystal

See also
 Jody (disambiguation)
 Jodee Nimerichter, American arts administrator

English given names
Masculine given names
Feminine given names
Unisex given names
English masculine given names
English feminine given names
English unisex given names
Hypocorisms